Conus amphiurgus, common name the amphiurgus cone, is a species of sea snail, a marine gastropod mollusc in the family Conidae, the cone snails and their allies.

These snails are predatory and venomous. They are capable of "stinging" humans, therefore live ones should be handled carefully or not at all.

Distribution
Locus typicus: "Pta. Guanajibo and Pta. Arenas, 
encompassing the Bahia Bramadero on the West coast of Puerto Rico."

This species occurs in the tropical Western Atlantic, the Caribbean Sea and the Gulf of Mexico.

Description 
The maximum recorded shell length is 54 mm.

Habitat 
Minimum recorded depth is 9 m. Maximum recorded depth is 61 m.

References

 Dall, W. H. 1889. Reports on the results of dredgings, under the supervision of Alexander Agassiz, in the Gulf of Mexico (1877–78) and in the Caribbean Sea (1879–80), by the U. S. Coast Survey Steamer 'Blake,'. Bulletin of the Museum of Comparative Zoology 18: 1–492, pls. 10–40.
 Clench, W. J. 1942. The Genus Conus in the Western Atlantic. Johnsonia 1(6) 1–40.
 Tucker J.K. & Tenorio M.J. (2009) Systematic classification of Recent and fossil conoidean gastropods. Hackenheim: Conchbooks. 296 pp.
 Puillandre N., Duda T.F., Meyer C., Olivera B.M. & Bouchet P. (2015). One, four or 100 genera? A new classification of the cone snails. Journal of Molluscan Studies. 81: 1–23

External links
 The Conus Biodiversity website
 Cone Shells – Knights of the Sea
 

amphiurgus
Gastropods described in 1889